was a Japanese samurai of the Azuchi–Momoyama period through early Edo period. The son of Takenaka Hanbei, Shigekado saw his first action at age 12, taking part in the Battle of Komaki in 1585. 

Following in his father's footsteps and served Toyotomi Hideyoshi, later siding with Tokugawa Ieyasu. At the Battle of Sekigahara, Shigekado along with Kuroda Nagamasa attacked the Western Army's main camp and Shigekado succeeded in chasing down and executing Konishi Yukinaga. 

In Shigekado's time, the Takenaka became kōtai-yoriai hatamoto. Studying Chinese and Japanese philosophy with Hayashi Razan, Shigekado was known for his skill in calligraphy and poetry.

Shigekado died in Edo at age 58, and was succeeded by his son Takenaka Shigetsune.

Notes

1573 births
1631 deaths
Samurai
17th-century Japanese historians